Grazia Livi (19 March 1930 – 18 January 2015) was an Italian author and journalist.

Born in Florence, Livi got a degree in Romance studies with Gianfranco Contini, then in 1958 she wrote her first novel, Gli scapoli di Londra (The London Bachelors). In the sixties she  started her career as a journalist working for several newspapers and magazines, notably La Nazione, Epoca and L'Europeo.  She then gradually decided to leave the journalism to devote herself to writing, as a novelist and an essayist. In 1991 she won the Essays Section of the Viareggio Prize with the book Le lettere del mio nome ("The letters of my name"), while in 1994 she was a finalist at the Strega Prize with Vincoli segreti ("Secret Constraints"), a collection of short stories .

She died in Milan in 2015.

References 

1930 births
2015 deaths
Writers from Florence
Italian essayists
Italian women essayists
Journalists from Florence
Viareggio Prize winners
20th-century Italian novelists
20th-century Italian women writers
20th-century essayists